"Callao" is a song by Peruvian singer Anna Carina released by 11y11 Records as the second single of her upcoming album.

Background and release
The song was released on January 11, 2019 along with a lyric video and was written by Anna Carina along with Oscarcito, Antonio Barullo, and Dale Play who are known for composing for big acts such as Thalía and Jennifer Lopez. Although the song's title is the same, it's not referring to the Peruvian providence of Callao, but instead to the verb of being quiet. The song topped the iTunes charts in Perú just a few hours after its release. The song also peaked inside the top 20 in the general airplay chart and top 3 in the pop airplay chart in Perú.

Live performances
Anna Carina performed the song on several television shows in order to promote it but most notably on Wantan Night which is co-hosted by her sister María Pía Copello.

Music video
The music video was released on February 28, 2019 on Anna Carina's official YouTube channel. It shows Anna Carina singing while dancing at the beach and having a beach party. The video includes cameos from several stars including Yo Soy judge Katia Palma. The video was shot in Miami and was choreographed by Anna Carina along with her sister María Pía Copello, who appeared in the video for her previous single and is a Peruvian children's television host.

Charts

Weekly charts

Year-end charts

Awards and nominations
The song was nominated for Best Pop/Urban Song at the Premios Fama in 2019. It was also nominated for Hit of the Year at the Premios Luces in 2019.

References

2019 singles
2019 songs
Anna Carina songs
Spanish-language songs